Deep Cove may refer to:

Places
In Canada
Deep Cove, British Columbia
Deep Cove, Newfoundland and Labrador
Deep Cove, Nova Scotia

In New Zealand
Deep Cove, New Zealand

In the United States
Deep Cove, Maine

Other
Deep Cove (album), a 2004 album by Renee Rosnes
Deep Cove (film), a 2009 horror film formerly known as Fear Island
Deep Cove Stories, a collection of short stories by Bill Gaston